Roy William Hearn (22 February 1908 – 18 August 1978) was an Australian rules footballer who played with Fitzroy in the Victorian Football League (VFL).

Notes

External links 

Roy Hearn's playing statistics from The VFA Project

1908 births
1978 deaths
Australian rules footballers from Melbourne
Fitzroy Football Club players
Brunswick Football Club players
Preston Football Club (VFA) players
People from Preston, Victoria